Bulmarket DM OOD is a private company, registered in 1996, based in the Bulgarian city of Ruse.

Operations

Petroleum derivatives
The company is one of the largest importers and exporters of LPG in Bulgaria. It has four terminals for gas and oil products in Bulgaria (Byala and Plovdiv) and Romania (Galați and Giurgiu), railway and tank trucks for gas and a ship-gas carrier for propane-butane. Imports are sourced from Russia, Kazakhstan and Romania for onward supply to customers in Bulgaria and the adjoining countries. The Galați terminal is located in an economic free zone to reduce the impact of customs. Bulmarket are also suppliers of diesel and petrol.

Port facilities
It owns a port on the Danube, Port Bulmarket JSC, equipped for handling liquid and bulk cargo. This includes a terminal for transshipment of gas from ship to rail and road, and storage for natural gas and propane-butane.

Compressed natural gas
The company has built a network of its own methane stations, supplying CNG to industrial consumers.

Alternative fuels
The company has had a biodiesel plant since 2008 and a crude vegetable oil plant since 2012.

Railway operations
Bulmarket was the first private railway carrier in Bulgaria. It was granted a license for railway transport on 21 October 2005, allowing it to operate freight trains across the Bulgarian railway network. It owns an extensive fleet of locomotives, acquired second hand from other European operators.

Locomotive fleet

References

Railway companies of Bulgaria